The Loner is an American western series that ran for one season on CBS from 1965 to 1966, under the alternate sponsorship of Philip Morris and Procter & Gamble.  The series was created by Rod Serling a year after the cancellation of The Twilight Zone. It was one of the last TV series on CBS to air in black-and-white.

Synopsis
The series was set in the years immediately following the American Civil War. Lloyd Bridges played the title character, William Colton, a former Union cavalry captain who headed to the American west in search of a new life. Each episode dealt with Colton's encounters with various individuals on his trek west.

Rod Serling was the series' creator. Longtime TV Guide critic Cleveland Amory wrote that Serling "obviously intended The Loner to be a realistic, adult Western," but the show's ratings indicated it was "either too real for a public grown used to the unreal Western or too adult for juvenile Easterners." Serling had expressed an open distaste for some of the television Westerns of the time in an editorial that set up the premise for "Showdown with Rance McGrew", an episode of The Twilight Zone in which a primadonna Western actor encounters the ghost of Jesse James; in that editorial, he is quoted as saying: "it seems a reasonable conjecture that if there are any television sets up in cowboy heaven and any of these rough-and-wooly nail-eaters could see with what careless abandon their names and exploits are being bandied about, they're very likely turning over in their graves - or worse, getting out of them."

The Loner aired Saturday nights at 9:30 Eastern. It debuted on September 18, 1965; the final episode aired March 12, 1966; selected repeats continued through April 30.

Episodes

Home media

In June 2016, Shout! Factory, in conjunction with Timeless Media Group, released The Loner as a Region 1 4-DVD set containing all 26 episodes of the series plus a featurette, The Wandering Man's Burden: Making "The Loner". The DVD set was initially made available in North America as a Walmart exclusive (both in-store and online).

In 1998, Jerry Goldsmith's theme music and his two episode scores ("An Echo Of Bugles" and "One Of The Wounded") were released by Film Score Monthly on a limited edition soundtrack album alongside his score for Stagecoach.

References

 Amory, C. (1966, January 15–21). Review: The Loner. TV Guide, p. 2
 Brooks, T. & Marsh, E. (1979). The Complete Directory To Primetime Network TV Shows. New York: Ballantine Books, p. 357

External links

 Tony Albarella's article on The Loner from Filmfax Magazine
 

1960s Western (genre) television series
1965 American television series debuts
1966 American television series endings
Black-and-white American television shows
CBS original programming
Television series by 20th Century Fox Television
Television series created by Rod Serling